In My Life is a 1993 album by jazz pianist Marian McPartland.

Reception

The album was positively reviewed by Scott Yanow at Allmusic who wrote that "Despite the diverse repertoire, McPartland's own flexible style shines through and her individual musical personality is felt in each song. ...McPartland's closing wistful solo piano version of "Singin' the Blues" (dedicated to her late husband, cornetist Jimmy McPartland) should not be missed". The Penguin Guide to Jazz Recordings included the album in its suggested “core collection” of essential recordings.

Track listing 
 "Grooveyard" (Carl Perkins) – 4:10
 "In My Life" (John Lennon, Paul McCartney) – 4:28
 "In the Days of Our Love" (Peggy Lee, Marian McPartland) – 3:47
 "Red Planet" (John Coltrane) – 5:57
 "What's New?" (Johnny Burke, Bob Haggart) – 5:01
 "Gone with the Wind" (Herbert Magidson, Allie Wrubel) – 5:20
 "Close Your Eyes" (Bernice Petkere) – 3:46
 "For Dizzy" (McPartland, George Young) – 2:25
 "Moon and Sand" (William Engvick, Morty Palitz, Alec Wilder) – 5:27
 "Naima" (John Coltrane) – 8:23
 "Velas" (Ivan Lins, Vítor Martins) – 5:23
 "Ramblin'" (Ornette Coleman) – 4:08
 "Singin' the Blues (Till My Daddy Comes Home)" (Con Conrad, Sam M. Lewis, J. Russel Robinson, Joe Young) – 3:39

Personnel 
 Marian McPartland – piano
 Chris Potter - alto saxophone, tenor saxophone
 Gary Mazzaroppi – bass
 Glenn Davis – drums
 Peter Beckerman – assistant engineer
 Elizabeth Bell – production coordination
 Chip Deffaa, Studs Terkel – liner notes
 Phil Edwards – remixing
 George Horn – mastering
 Carl Jefferson – producer
 Kent Judkins – art direction
 A.T. Michael MacDonald – engineer
 Sylvia Rogers – illustrations

References

1993 albums
Marian McPartland albums
Concord Records albums
Albums produced by Carl Jefferson